Titus Aurelius Fulvus was a Roman senator, who was active during the reign of Domitian. Fulvus is best known as the father of Roman Emperor Antoninus Pius. His father, also named Titus Aurelius Fulvus, had also been twice consul and promoted to the patrician class.

Biography 
Titus Aurelius Fulvus was ordinary consul in 89 with Marcus Asinius Atratinus as his colleague. This Fulvus has been described by Augustan History as a "stern and upright man". The younger Fulvus married Arria Fadilla, a daughter of the consul Gnaeus Arrius Antoninus and friend to the historian Pliny the Younger. Their only child was Titus Aurelius Fulvus Boionius Arrius Antoninus, who was born in Lanuvium (modern Lanuvio), Italy, on 19 September 86; who was raised by Fulvus' father-in-law after his early death. This son became the emperor Antoninus Pius.

See also
 Augustan History

References

External links
 Roman-empire.net
 Roman-emperors.org

1st-century Romans
Titus
Imperial Roman consuls
People from Nîmes